The  was a multi-purpose event facility located in Nakajima Park in Chūō-ku, Sapporo, Hokkaido, Japan. It was built in 1954 for the National Sports Festival of Japan. A concert by the rock band Rainbow in January 1978 resulted in one death when 2,000 fans rushed the stage. By the end of the 1990s, the facility had lost its viability and was eventually demolished.

References

Buildings and structures in Chūō-ku, Sapporo
Music venues in Japan
Sports venues in Sapporo
Sports venues completed in 1954
1954 establishments in Japan